Długa Kościelna  is a village in the administrative district of Gmina Halinów, within Mińsk County, Masovian Voivodeship, in east-central Poland.

The village has a population of 723.

There are two churches and parishes in the village: the Catholic Saint Anne church and the Catholic Mariavite Blessed Sacrament church.

References

Villages in Mińsk County